"Spirit in the Sky" is a song by American singer-songwriter Norman Greenbaum, originally written and recorded by Greenbaum and released in late 1969 from the album of the same name. The single became a gold record, selling two million copies from 1969 to 1970, and reached No. 3 on the US Billboard Hot 100 where it lasted for 15 weeks in the Top 100. Billboard ranked the record the No. 22 song of 1970. It also climbed to No. 1 on the UK, Australian and Canadian charts in 1970. Rolling Stone ranked "Spirit in the Sky" No. 333 on its list of the "500 Greatest Songs of All Time". Cover versions by Doctor and the Medics and Gareth Gates have also made the No. 1 spot in the UK.

The song is also known for being one of the top one-hit wonders of all time.

Original version by Norman Greenbaum
"Spirit in the Sky" makes several religious references to Jesus, although Greenbaum himself is Jewish. In a 2006 interview with The New York Times, Greenbaum told a reporter he was inspired to write the song after watching Porter Wagoner singing a gospel song on TV. Greenbaum said: "I thought, 'Yeah, I could do that,' knowing nothing about gospel music, so I sat down and wrote my own gospel song. It came easy. I wrote the words in 15 minutes."  The song is in the Key of A. 

Greenbaum had previously been a member of psychedelic jug band Dr. West's Medicine Show and Junk Band. When they split up he won a solo contract with producer Erik Jacobsen for Reprise Records. Jacobsen had previously worked with The Lovin' Spoonful and the song was included on Greenbaum's first solo album. The song's arrangement came together in the studio in San Francisco where lead guitarist Russell DaShiell, bass player Doug Killmer from the band Crowfoot and drummer Norman Mayell from the band Sopwith Camel worked with Greenbaum. According to The New York Times article, Greenbaum used a Fender Telecaster guitar with a fuzz box built into the body to generate the song's characteristic guitar sound. 

The resulting sound was an "oddly good and compelling" combination of gospel and hard rock music, with loud drums, distorted electric guitar, clapping hands, and tambourines. The production team brought in the Stovall Sisters, an Oakland-based gospel trio, to sing backing vocals. Because of the song's length and lyrics, the record company was initially reluctant to issue it, but it was finally released as a single after two other singles from the album had poor sales. "Spirit in the Sky" became a worldwide hit, and was at the time the best-selling single ever for the Reprise label.

There is a music video with Greenbaum singing the song.

About the song, Greenbaum has been quoted as saying, "It sounds as fresh today as when it was recorded. I've gotten letters from funeral directors telling me that it's their second-most-requested song to play at memorial services, next to 'Danny Boy'."

The song was featured in the soundtrack to the 2013 film This is the End and was included in the soundtrack for the 2014 film Guardians of the Galaxy, and the 1995 film Apollo 13.

Charts

Weekly charts

Year-end charts

Certifications

Doctor and the Medics version

In June 1986, Doctor and the Medics reached No. 1 on the UK Singles Chart with their version of the song, spending three weeks at the top. In New Zealand, the song reached No. 2 on the RIANZ Singles Chart, while in Canada, it peaked at No. 1 for a week and was the fifth-highest-selling single of 1986. The song has been certified silver by the British Phonographic Industry (BPI) and platinum by the Canadian Recording Industry Association (CRIA).

Charts

Weekly charts

Year-end charts

Certifications

Gareth Gates (with the Kumars) version

"Spirit in the Sky" served as the first single from Pop Idol runner-up Gareth Gates's second studio album, Go Your Own Way. The single was released on March 14, 2003, and was the official Comic Relief charity single for 2003. The song features guest vocals from the Kumars. The song peaked at number one on the UK Singles Chart, becoming Gates' fourth number-one single. Gates' version has been certified platinum by BPI in the UK.

Track listing 
UK CD1
 "Spirit in the Sky" (with the Kumars)
 "Dance Again"
 "Spirit in the Sky"
 "Spirit in the Sky" (video)

UK CD2
 "Spirit in the Sky" (with the Kumars)
 "Will You Wait for Me?"
 Interview with Gareth Gates

UK cassette single
 "Spirit in the Sky" (with the Kumars)
 "Dance Again"
 "Will You Wait for Me?"

UK DVD single
 "Spirit in the Sky" (video)
 Making of "Spirit in the Sky" (video)
 "Dance Again" (video)
 Interview with the Kumars (video)

Charts

Weekly charts

Year-end charts

Certifications

Other versions

A version by Dorothy Combs Morrison reached No. 99 on Billboard's Hot 100 in October 1970, and No. 47 in Canada during November of that same year.

The country-rock group The Kentucky Headhunters released a cover on their 1991 album Electric Barnyard.

Nina Hagen recorded two versions of the song, one in English and one in German. Each was released in 1985 on the same language version of her album Nina Hagen in Ekstasy. Both were also released as singles.

In 2013, Rolling Stones bassist Bill Wyman revealed that he recorded a demo of the song in November 1985 and had sent it to a film company for the prospective use in a new film. The demo cassette was not returned and Doctor and the Medics' version was released in June of the following year.

Canadian rock musician Sam Roberts released a version of the song as part of his 2015 EP Counting the Days.

William Shatner released a spoken-word version on his third album Seeking Major Tom.

See also
 List of 1970s one-hit wonders in the United States

References

1969 singles
1970 singles
1986 singles
2003 singles
Gareth Gates songs
Norman Greenbaum songs
Cashbox number-one singles
UK Singles Chart number-one singles
Number-one singles in Scotland
Number-one singles in Germany
Number-one singles in Australia
Irish Singles Chart number-one singles
Comic Relief singles
RPM Top Singles number-one singles
19 Recordings singles
Bertelsmann Music Group singles
RCA Records singles
Reprise Records singles
Syco Music singles
Songs about death
Songs about Jesus
1969 songs
Song recordings produced by Erik Jacobsen
Gospel songs